Maude Smith Gagnon (born 1980) is a Quebec poet.

She was born in the Basse-Côte-Nord region of Quebec and studied at the Université du Québec à Montréal. Her first collection of poetry Une tonne d’air was awarded the Prix Émile-Nelligan in 2006. Her collection of poems Un drap. Une place received the Governor General's Award for French-language poetry in 2012.

References 

1980 births
Living people
Canadian poets in French
Canadian women poets
21st-century Canadian poets
21st-century Canadian women writers
People from Côte-Nord
Writers from Quebec
Université du Québec à Montréal alumni
Governor General's Award-winning poets